Wibbly Pig's Silly Big Bear is a children's picture book written and illustrated by Mick Inkpen, published in 2006. It won the Nestlé Children's Book Prize Bronze Award.

See also

References

2006 children's books
British picture books
British children's books
Pigs in literature
Books about bears